Bernardo Rodríguez Arias, nicknamed Berni Rodríguez (born 7 June 1980) is a Spanish retired professional basketball player. He is 1.97 m (6 ft 5 ¾ in) tall.

Professional career
Rodríguez began his men's club career with Unicaja Macias of the Liga EBA (Spanish 4th division), the farm team of Unicaja Málaga, during the 1998–99 season. He then moved to the senior club of Unicaja Málaga of the top-level Spanish ACB League, for the 1999–00 season.

In June 2012, after 13 seasons with Málaga, Rodríguez left Unicaja Malaga. The club decided to retire his number 5 jersey.

A month and a half later, he signed with the Spanish League club UCAM Murcia, where he decided to play with the number 41, out of respect to his old number 5 at Málaga.

In July 2016, Rodríguez announced his retirement from playing professional basketball.

National team career
Rodríguez played internationally with the senior Spain national team that won the gold medal at the 2006 FIBA World Championship. With Spain, he also won the silver medal at the 2007 EuroBasket, and the silver medal at the 2008 Summer Olympics.

After retirement
Five days after announcing his retirement from playing professional club basketball, Rodríguez signed on as the sporting director of the Spanish League club Baloncesto Sevilla, which was the last club that he played at.

References

External links
FIBA Profile
FIBA Europe Profile
Euroleague.net Profile
Spanish League Archive Profile 

1980 births
Living people
2006 FIBA World Championship players
Basketball executives
Baloncesto Málaga players
Basketball players at the 2008 Summer Olympics
CB Murcia players
FIBA World Championship-winning players
Liga ACB players
Medalists at the 2008 Summer Olympics
Olympic basketball players of Spain
Olympic medalists in basketball
Olympic silver medalists for Spain
Real Betis Baloncesto players
Shooting guards
Small forwards
Spanish men's basketball players
Sportspeople from Málaga
20th-century Spanish people
21st-century Spanish people